Monk's Dream is an album by jazz pianist Thelonious Monk that was released by Columbia Records in March 1963. It was Monk's first album for Columbia following his five-year recording period with Riverside Records.

Recording and music
"Bye-Ya" and "Bolivar Blues" were recorded on October 31, 1962; "Body and Soul" and "Bright Mississippi" on November 1; "Sweet and Lovely", "Just a Gigolo" and "Monk's Dream" on November 2; and "Five Spot Blues" on November 6.

"Bright Mississippi" is the only composition on the album that Monk had not previously recorded. "Bolivar Blues" was originally titled "Ba-lue Bolivar Ba-lues-are" and had been on Monk's 1957 Riverside album, Brilliant Corners. "Five Spot Blues" was called "Blues Five Spot" and first appeared on the album Misterioso, which was recorded in concert at the Five Spot Cafe in New York in 1958 and released by Riverside. "Monk's Dream", "Bye-Ya", and "Sweet and Lovely" were recorded for Prestige at a session ten years earlier.

Reception

In Down Beat magazine, jazz critic Pete Welding gave the album five stars and called it "a stunning reaffirmation of his powers as a performer and composer."

Track listing

Personnel 
 Thelonious Monk – piano
 Charlie Rouse – tenor saxophone
 John Ore – bass 
 Frankie Dunlop – drums

References 

1963 albums
Columbia Records albums
Thelonious Monk albums
Albums produced by Teo Macero
Albums recorded at CBS 30th Street Studio